Christopher Allen Gardocki (born February 7, 1970) is an American former professional football player who was a punter in the National Football League (NFL). Gardocki played for the Chicago Bears, Indianapolis Colts, Cleveland Browns, and Pittsburgh Steelers from 1991 to 2006. He won Super Bowl XL with the Steelers over the Seattle Seahawks.

Early career

Gardocki played as the quarterback, kicker, and punter for Redan High School in Stone Mountain, Georgia. He declared for the NFL after his junior year at Clemson University.

Professional career

Through the end of the 2006 NFL regular season, Gardocki holds the NFL record for most consecutive punts (1,177 for his career) with no blocks. Gardocki averaged a career-best 45.7 yards per punt for the Colts in 1996 and was selected for the Pro Bowl.  After playing for both AFC North rivals Cleveland and Pittsburgh, Gardocki was released by the Steelers on May 23, 2007, less than a month after the team selected Baylor punter Daniel Sepulveda in the 2007 NFL Draft.

Gardocki is best remembered by some for an incident while playing for the Browns in a 2000 game against the Steelers in Cleveland Browns Stadium. After being tackled by Steelers linebacker Joey Porter following a punt that left Gardocki briefly motionless (Porter would be penalized for roughing the punter), Gardocki flipped the middle finger twice to Steelers head coach Bill Cowher. The incident, caught on live television, resulted in a $5,000 fine for Gardocki.

Personal life
Chris' wife, Sally Gardocki, is a real estate attorney. They have a son named Cole, born in 1995, and raised on Hilton Head Island, South Carolina. In 1997, Sally, an attorney and author, wrote a book titled "The Wives Room", which provided a behind-the-scenes look at the life of an NFL wife. Both donate time to several non-profit organizations including the Boys and Girls Club and the Taste of the NFL, and have regularly served turkey dinners to area residents during the holidays.

See also
List of most consecutive starts and games played by National Football League players

References

1970 births
Living people
American football punters
Clemson Tigers football players
Chicago Bears players
Indianapolis Colts players
Cleveland Browns players
Pittsburgh Steelers players
American Conference Pro Bowl players
People from Stone Mountain, Georgia
Players of American football from Georgia (U.S. state)
Sportspeople from DeKalb County, Georgia